Telok Panglima Garang is a mukim in Kuala Langat District, Selangor, Malaysia. The Telok Panglima Garang Free Trade Zone (FTZ) is located here. The town is administered by the Zone 4, 5 and 8 of the Kuala Langat Municipal Council.

Transportation
Telok Panglima Garang is connected by Federal Route 5 Klang-Banting Highway. In 2012, the town was connected by South Klang Valley Expressway.

References

Kuala Langat District
Mukims of Selangor